"Teddy Bear" is a song recorded by South Korean girl group STAYC for their fourth single album of the same name. It was released as the single album's lead single by High Up Entertainment on February 14, 2023.

Background and release
On January 18, 2023, High Up Entertainment announced that STAYC would be releasing an album in February. On January 31, it was announced STAYC would be releasing their fourth single album titled Teddy Bear on February 14. The music video teasers were released on February 5 and 12.

Composition
"Teddy Bear" was written by B.E.P with Flyt, composed by B.E.P and Jeon Goon, and arranged by Rado with Flyt. It was described as a pop punk song with lyrics that "contains a message of positivity that gives hope and comfort". "Teddy Bear" was composed in the key of G major, with a tempo of 119 beats per minute.

Commercial performance
"Teddy Bear" debuted at number 56 on South Korea's Circle Digital Chart in the chart issue dated February 12–18, 2023; on its component charts, the song debuted at number three on the Circle Download Chart, number 84 on the Circle Streaming Chart, and number 137 on the Circle BGM Chart. It ascended to number 12 on the Circle Digital Chart, and number 15 on the Circle Streaming Chart in the following week. The song also debuted at number 16 on the Billboard South Korea Songs in the chart issue dated March 4, 2023.

Promotion
Following the release of Teddy Bear, on February 14, 2023, STAYC held a live event to introduce the single album and its songs, including "Teddy Bear", and to communicate with their fans. The group subsequently performed four music programs in the first week: Mnet's M Countdown on February 16, KBS's Music Bank on February 17, MBC's Show! Music Core on February 18, and SBS's Inkigayo on February 19. On the second week, they performed on six music programs: SBS M's The Show on February 21, MBC M's Show Champion on February 22, M Countdown on February 23, Music Bank on February 24, Show! Music Core on February 25, and Inkigayo on February 26, where they won first place for all appearances except M Countdown and Show! Music Core.

Accolades

Charts

Weekly charts

Monthly charts

Release history

See also
 List of Inkigayo Chart winners (2023)
 List of Music Bank Chart winners (2023)
 List of Show! Music Core Chart winners (2023)
 List of Show Champion Chart winners (2023)
 List of The Show Chart winners (2023)

References

STAYC songs
2023 songs
2023 singles
Korean-language songs
Song recordings produced by Black Eyed Pilseung